The Women on the 6th Floor (also known as Service Entrance) is a 2010 French film directed and part-written by Philippe Le Guay. Principal roles are taken by Fabrice Luchini, Sandrine Kiberlain, Natalia Verbeke and Carmen Maura.

Set in Paris in 1962, the story alternates between two different worlds. One is a traditional wealthy family in a comfortable apartment, whose lives are devoted to making money and meaningless socialising. The other is the underpaid and overworked domestic servants living in cramped conditions above them. As few French people want such work, the jobs are taken by Spanish women, eager to escape the poverty and oppression of Francoist Spain, who bring with them their native solidarity and human warmth.

Plot
Jean-Louis Joubert is a stockbroker living with his wife Suzanne, who does not work, in a large apartment. The family's French maid leaves after a dispute, so Suzanne goes to a church where the priest finds jobs for Spanish immigrants. There she hires María, young and pretty, who speaks French and is the niece of Concepción, the maid for another family in the same building.

The apartment is a mess after days without a maid and Concepción gets some of her Spanish friends to rally round and clean it up, to the surprise and delight of Suzanne. When Suzanne wants some furniture moved up to a little room on the 6th floor that they use for storage, Jean-Louis discovers that the other little rooms there, all unheated, are occupied by Spanish maids, including their María. There is only one cold water tap on the landing for them to wash themselves and one Turkish toilet that is forever getting blocked. He calls a plumber to fix the toilet and says that María can use their own bathroom. He also lets another maid come in to use their phone for an urgent call home.

Though he has been struck by María since first seeing her, he becomes a friend to the other women too and starts learning about Spanish language, life and culture. His wife Suzanne begins to worry, not about the maids who are mostly not  young or beautiful and in any case are only servants, but about a rich client of his called Bettina de Brossolettes who is a notorious maneater. When they have a cocktail party in their flat, she is furious on finding that Bettina is invited. During the party Jean-Louis catches a hired waiter trying to kiss María and, furious, sacks him on the spot. María, furious now that Jean-Louis has openly revealed his feelings for her, accuses him of being a lecher and treats him with contempt.

Meanwhile Jean-Louis has found a new post for one of the Spanish women, who invites him and all the others to a paella party. When María turns up, she is furious to find Jean-Louis there and enjoying himself. Arriving home late to a furious Suzanne, he is accused of having been with Bettina. He says that he was and agrees to move out. Taking over the storeroom on the 6th floor, he is not only close to María but becomes more closely involved in the lives of the other women on the floor. He goes to their church on Sundays, a new experience for him, and takes some of them in his car for a pilgrimage to Lisieux.

Concepción is now worried that María will again fall for a man who will not marry her and, to stop any affair between the two, tells María where in Spain the son of her previous relationship now is. María immediately tells Suzanne she is leaving to return to Spain and, going upstairs in an emotional state, lets Jean-Louis take her into his room and kiss her. She spends the night with him and next day disappears to Spain. He is very hurt, not only because she did not tell him but also because all the other women he thought his friends were silent too.

Three years later, Jean-Louis drives to Spain looking for Concepción. When he tracks her down, she claims she does not know where María is. However her husband, who recognises what Jean-Louis is feeling, secretly tells him. When he drives there, he sees María hanging out her washing and the looks that the two exchange show their love for each other.

Cast

 Fabrice Luchini as Jean-Louis Joubert
 Sandrine Kiberlain as Suzanne Joubert
 Natalia Verbeke as María Gonzalez
 Carmen Maura as Concepción Ramirez
 Lola Dueñas as Carmen
 Berta Ojea as Dolores Carbalan
 Nuria Solé as Teresa
 Concha Galán as Pilar
 Audrey Fleurot as Bettina de Brossolette
 Marie-Armelle Deguy as Colette de Bergeret
 Muriel Solvay as Nicole de Grandcourt
 Philippe Duquesne as Gérard
 Annie Mercier as Madame Triboulet
 Michèle Gleizer as Germaine Bronech
 Camille Gigot as Bertrand Joubert
 Jean-Charles Deval as Olivier Joubert
 Christine Vézinet as Valentine
 Jeupeu as Boulard
 Vincent Nemeth as Monsieur Armand
 Philippe du Janerand as Piquer
 Patrick Bonnel as Golmard
 Laurent Claret as Blamond
 Jean-Claude Jay as Pelletier
 Joan Massotkleiner as Fernando
 Ivan Martin Salan as Miguel

Production
Two of the Spanish actresses, Berta Ojea and Concha Galán, did not speak French before the film and learned their roles phonetically.

Release
The film premièred at the Montpellier International Festival of Mediterranean Film on 23 October 2010 and its cinematic run in France began on 16 February 2011.  First shown in the USA in March 2011 at Rendezvous with French Cinema, it began its release there on 7 October 2011. The film was screened out of competition at the Berlinale in 2011.

Reception
It was well received by critics and audiences. Le Monde wrote "The entertainment is as good as the actors are pitch-perfect. Fabrice Luchini and Sandrine Kiberlain are among our best stars." Dissenting, La Croix described the "lazy screenplay, poor dialogue, catalogue of clichés, poor quality mise en scène". The New York Press reviewed the film at the Rendez-vous with French Film festival in New York, calling it "charming".

Awards
The movie was nominated in three categories at the César Award 2012 : Best costume design, Best production design and Best supporting actress. It won the Best supporting actress César - Carmen Maura.

Discography
The original soundtrack to Les Femmes du 6e étage is included on the CD compilation Les Musiques de Jorge Arriagada pour les films de Philippe Le Guay, released by Canadian label Disques Cinémusique in 2013. French and English liner notes.

References

External links
 SND Films listing
 
 

2010 films
2010 comedy films
French comedy films
Films set in Paris
Films featuring a Best Supporting Actress César Award-winning performance
Films set in 1962
Films directed by Philippe Le Guay
2010s French films